Events from the year 1971 in North Korea.

Incumbents
Premier: Kim Il-sung 
Supreme Leader: Kim Il-sung

Events

Births
 10 May – Kim Jong-nam.
 25 July – Kim Il.
 27 September – Shin Je-bon.

See also
Years in Japan
Years in South Korea

References

 
North Korea
1970s in North Korea
Years of the 20th century in North Korea
North Korea